The Alternative Miss World is an art and fashion event presented in the form of a beauty pageant. It was founded by Andrew Logan in 1972, and has been held irregularly since, with the 14th competition held in 2018. Alternative Miss World has been described as a "pansexual beauty pageant" where the "bizarre is beautiful", and it has attracted figures from the world of art, fashion and entertainment, including David Hockney, Derek Jarman, Zandra Rhodes, Vivienne Westwood, Brian Eno, and Grayson Perry.  It is the subject of the documentary films The British Guide to Showing Off and The Alternative Miss World.

Format

The competition follows the format used by Miss World whereby the contestants are required to wear three separate sets of costumes – daywear, swimwear and evening wear. A panel of judges determines the winner based on the poise, personality and originality of the contestants. Judges have included Jarvis Cocker, Tim Curry, Billy Connolly, Brian Eno, Zandra Rhodes, David Bailey, Brian Clarke, Ossie Clark, Richard O'Brien, Molly Parkin, Anita Roddick, Zoe Wanamaker, Nick Rhodes, and Sir Norman Rosenthal.

All the events were hosted by Logan, dressed half as a woman and half as a man.  Many of the female halves of his costume were designed by Zandra Rhodes. Logan may be accompanied by co-hosts, such as Divine, Grayson Perry, Julian Clary and Ruby Wax, and assisted by a "secretary".   Notable participants include Derek Jarman who won in 1975 as Miss Crêpe Suzette, John Maybury as Miss Windscale Nuclear Power Station, Leigh Bowery as Miss Fuck It, and Grayson Perry  as Miss St Claire Perry of Essex, dressed as Jesus on the Cross.

History
The first Alternative Miss World was held on 25 March 1972 in the studio of Andrew Logan in Downham Road, Hackney which was a converted jigsaw factory. The event was inspired by a visit to the Crufts dog show, and the contestants in the competition would be judged on the same criteria as the dogs at Crufts: poise, personality and originality. The first event was attended by David Hockney and Robert Medley who were in the judges panel. The second was also held in Logan's studio, with Angie Bowie appearing as one of the judges (it was claimed that David Bowie could not get in due to overcrowding at the place). Other attendees included Jude Moraes and the cast of The Rocky Horror Show. Starting that year, the winner received crown jewels designed by Logan. The third outing of the competition was held in Logan's new studio in Butler's Wharf, and a theme, "Wild", was introduced this year. The event was attended by Malcolm McLaren and Vivienne Westwood where one of the contestants, Gaby Longhi, competed in ripped-up clothes with safety pins that would later become a feature of the punk style.

The 1978 Alternative Miss World, with Divine as co-host, was filmed by Richard Gayer.  The resulting documentary film, titled The Alternative Miss World, was shown at the Cannes Film Festival in 1980. The Miss World organisation, represented by the future Prime Minister Tony Blair, attempted to block the film's showing at the Odeon in Leicester Square on the same night as the Miss World contest, but the case was dismissed by Lord Denning.

The following Alternative Miss World in 1981 was the largest yet organised and it was held at the Grand Hall of Olympia in West Kensington, London. The scale of this event left Logan with a debt of £25,000, but he was helped by donations, including a painting from David Hockney. This event was later broadcast on Channel 4. In 1986, Logan intended to use Chislehurst Caves in south east London as a venue, however, protests from the locals concerned about AIDS forced its relocation at short notice to the Brixton Academy. 

Although the competition is open to both men and women, it was only in 1986 that the first woman won – Jenny Runacre as Miss National Geographic. The previous year's competition was won by a robot created by Bruce Lacey, Miss ROSA BOSOM (Radio Operated Simulated Actress Battery or Standby Operated Mains), which was first designed for a theatre production in 1966. The 1998 Alternative Miss World was won by 75-year-old Russian woman, Miss Pani Bronya, who became its oldest winner.  There has been a significant Russian presence since 1995, and the 2018 competition was won by the Russian performance artist Andrey Bartenev as Miss UFO.

Events
Andrew Logan is the host and hostess of Alternative Miss World.

See also
Alternative Miss Ireland

References

External links
Alternative Miss World

Beauty pageants in England
Recurring events established in 1972
1972 establishments in England